The list of Tulu films that are scheduled to be released in 2018.

Releases

January – June

July – December

See also
List of Tulu films of 2020
List of Tulu films of 2019
List of Tulu films of 2017
List of Tulu films of 2016
List of Tulu films of 2015
List of Tulu films of 2014
List of Released Tulu films
Tulu cinema
 Tulu Movie Actors
 Tulu Movie Actresses
Karnataka State Film Award for Best Regional film
RED FM Tulu Film Awards

References
News Related Tulu Film:

External links
 Mangaluru: Coastalwood and K Sooraj Shetty verses Mayur R Shetty
 Mangaluru: Appe Teacher

Tulu
Tulu-language films
Tulu